Roy Green (born 1947) is a radio personality based in Montreal, Quebec, Canada. He was born in Switzerland but then moved to Montreal as a young child.

Green arrived in Hamilton from his hometown of Montreal in 1973 and started his radio career there at a rock station CKGM as a teen. He has worked in Hamilton's CHML and Toronto's "Talk640", as well as hosting a regional Ontario network program. He retired from daily programs on March 30, 2007 but continues to host weekly shows, heard nationally, on Corus Radio weekends from 2-5pm ET.

He has reaped many honours in the industry and community including being named a finalist in the City of Hamilton's 'Distinguished Citizen of the Year' in 2003, being inducted into the City of Hamilton's Gallery of Distinction in 2008, and was a recipient three consecutive times of the Canadian Association of Broadcasters' 'Gold Ribbon' as 'Best in Canada'.

Green has also been working as a fill-in host on the Charles Adler program on CHML. He also plans to continue working for station owner Corus Radio on special projects.

References

External links
AM900 CHML Bio: Roy Green

1947 births
Living people
Anglophone Quebec people
Canadian radio personalities
People from Montreal
Swiss emigrants to Canada